Aroga hulthemiella is a moth of the family Gelechiidae. It is found in northern Iran.

References

Moths described in 1960
Aroga
Moths of Asia